Minuscule 34 (in the Gregory-Aland numbering), A19 (Von Soden). It is a Greek minuscule manuscript of the New Testament, written on vellum. Palaeographically it has been assigned to the 10th century.

Description 

The codex contains the text of the four Gospels with three lacunae. The text is written in one column per page, 22 lines per page, on 469 parchment leaves. It is elegantly written. The headpieces and the initial letters are ornamented with colours.

The leaves 1-3 were supplied by a later hand, with Homilien of Psellus.

The text is surrounded by a catena (in Mark of Victorinus). Text of Mark 16:8-20 has not a commentary. Catena is similar to that of 194.

There is also another division according to the smaller Ammonian Sections (in Mark 241 Sections, the last section in 16:20), but there are no references to the Eusebian Canons.

The commentary of Victorinus in Gospel of Mark, from the same original as in codex 39.

Text 

The Greek text of the codex is a representative of the Byzantine text-type. Aland placed it in Category V. It was not examined by the Claremont Profile Method.

It lacks Matthew 16:2b–3. The text of the Pericope Adulterae (John 7:53-8:11) is marked as a doubtful. It has note at the margin: "mais c'est une erreur. None avone verifie le passage avec soin et cette note n'y existe nulle part".

It contains text of Luke 22:43-44 without obelus or asterisk, but it has questionable scholion at the margin.

History 

The manuscript was dated by Scholz and Martin to the 10th century. It is dated by the INTF to the 10th century.

The manuscript was written on the Mount Athos, it belonged to the Stavronikita monastery. It was brought by Pierre Seguier to France and became part of the Fonds Coislin.

The manuscript was examined and described by Montfaucon, Wettstein, Scholz, Tischendorf, Paulin Martin,  and Burgon.

It was added to the list of the New Testament manuscripts by J. J. Wettstein, who gave it the number 34. C. R. Gregory saw the manuscript in 1885.

It is currently housed at the Bibliothèque nationale de France (Coislin Gr. 195) at Paris.

See also 

 List of New Testament minuscules
 Biblical manuscripts
 Textual criticism

References

Further reading 

 Bernard de Montfaucon, Bibliotheca Coisliniana, olim Segueriana, Paris: Ludovicus Guerin & Carolus Robustel, 1715, p. 247.

Greek New Testament minuscules
10th-century biblical manuscripts
Fonds Coislin